Winster is a village in the English Derbyshire Dales about  from Matlock and  from Bakewell at an altitude of approximately . It was formerly a centre for the lead mining industry. The village lies within the Peak District National Park and The Peak District Boundary Walk runs through the village. Winster has many listed buildings, including the Market House open daily as a National Trust information point. Its current population is about 630, though it was 600 at the 2011 Census. The village has a primary school, two churches, two pubs and a village shop (owned by the community) which includes a post office. Winster was mentioned in the Domesday Book in 1086 when it was owned by Henry de Ferrers.

A workhouse at Bank Top was opened in 1744. It had a rule that forbade any relief outside of the workhouse. By the 1770s it could house 40 inmates.

Winster Market House was the National Trust's first property in the Peak District and was acquired in 1906.

Winster Wakes

Winster's parish church is the Church of St John the Baptist, and a week-long annual carnival called Winster Wakes starts on the first Sunday on or after 24 June (the patronal day of St John the Baptist). Main Street is closed briefly on the Sunday for the Wakes Parade, and for much of the following Saturday afternoon, when there are stalls and entertainment (including Morris Dancing) in the street.

Fatal duel 
As reported in The Times (London) on 2 June 1821, a local surgeon, William Cuddie, was courting Mary, the daughter of the wealthy Brittlebank family of Oddo House in Winster. In May 1821 one of her brothers, William Brittlebank, tried to end their association. On the evening of 21 May Cuddie and Brittlebank quarreled violently. The doctor later received a note:

Cuddie refused to reply to the letter. The following afternoon three of the Brittlebank brothers and a mutual friend, Edmund Spencer, arrived in his garden with two loaded pistols. Cuddie reluctantly accepted one of the weapons. Two shots were heard but only Cuddie was hit. He died a few hours later.

Two of the Brittlebanks (Francis and Andrew) were tried in Derby in August 1821, but were found not guilty of murder, while their brother William, fled with a £100 reward on his head. It is thought that he went to Australia but evidence is lacking.

See also
Listed buildings in Winster

References

External links

 Winster village website

Villages in Derbyshire
Towns and villages of the Peak District
Civil parishes in Derbyshire
Derbyshire Dales